Made in Brazil is a 2015 studio album by Brazilian jazz pianist Eliane Elias and the first of her albums in thirty years to be recorded in her home country, Brazil. The album earned Elias a Grammy Award for Best Latin Jazz Album.

Reception
Eric Ford of LondonJazz noted, "Whilst the cover of this CD looks like it might be aiming directly at the easy listening/music for seduction end of the spectrum, the CD itself is a subtle masterclass in phrasing, groove, taste, rhythmic suppleness, harmonic sophistication and songwriting. Three generations of Brazilian songwriters are represented". The Buffalo News review by Jeff Simon noted, "A couple of her solos are impressive here. But at this stage of musical history, with so many classic Bossa Nova and Brazilian music discs available, there is almost no getting around the monotony of the bossa nova over the course of a whole new disc."

Judy Cantor-Navas of Billboard wrote "Sensual and breezy, the set—which includes classics "Waters of March" and "Aquarela do Brasil", as well as six of her own compositions—transmits Elias' delight at recording in her homeland with local musicians."

Track listing

Personnel
 Eliane Elias – vocals, piano, keyboards, producer
 Marc Johnson – double bass, producer 
 Rob Mathes – orchestra, conductor
 Steve Rodby – producer

Chart positions

References

External links

2015 albums
Eliane Elias albums
Grammy Award for Best Latin Jazz Album